Trachelosaurus is an extinct genus of lizard-like early archosauromorph reptiles from the Protorosauria within the monotypic family Trachelosauridae that was originally described as a dinosaur until it was redescribed in 1988 by Robert L. Carroll. The type species, T. fischeri, was described by F. Broili & E. Fischer in 1917 based on remains found in the Solling Formation (Buntsandstein), Bernburg, Germany.

References 

Prehistoric archosauromorphs
Early Triassic reptiles of Europe
Triassic Germany
Fossils of Germany
Fossil taxa described in 1917
Prehistoric reptile genera